Drysdale is a Scottish familial lineage belonging to the Douglas clan, and may refer to:

People and fictional characters
 Drysdale (surname)

Places
 Drysdale, Buenos Aires, a Scottish place name in Argentina
 Drysdale, Victoria, Australia, a town
 Electoral division of Drysdale, Northern Territory, Australia
 Drysdale Island, Northern Territory
 Drysdale River, Western Australia
 Mount Drysdale, New South Wales, Australia
 Drysdale, Ontario, Canada, a community
 Mount Drysdale, British Columbia, Canada
 Drysdale, Arizona, United States, a census-designated place

Other
 Drysdale sheep, a breed of sheep developed by Dr Francis Dry in 1931 in New Zealand
 Drysdale Football Club, an Australian rules football and netball club based in Drysdale, Victoria, Australia
 Drysdale railway station, Victoria, Australia
 Drysdale V8, an Australian brand of motorcycle with a V8 motorcycle engine